The ninth season of British science fiction television series Doctor Who began on 1 January 1972 with Day of the Daleks, and ended with The Time Monster. This is the third series of the Third Doctor, played by Jon Pertwee, as well as the third to be produced by Barry Letts and script edited by Terrance Dicks.

Casting

Main cast 
 Jon Pertwee as the Third Doctor
 Katy Manning as Jo Grant

Jon Pertwee continues his role as the Third Doctor, as does Katy Manning playing Jo Grant.

Recurring cast
 Nicholas Courtney as Brigadier Lethbridge-Stewart
 John Levene as Sergeant Benton
 Richard Franklin as Mike Yates
 Roger Delgado as The Master

Nicholas Courtney, John Levene and Richard Franklin continue their roles of Brigadier Lethbridge-Stewart, Sergeant Benton and Captain Mike Yates respectively.

Roger Delgado returns to play The Master in The Sea Devils and The Time Monster.

Guest stars
Alan Bennion makes his second of three appearances in the series playing an Ice Warrior, portraying Lord Izlyr in The Curse of Peladon and Valentine Palmer plays Monia in episodes 3 and 4.

Serials 

The first serial, Day of the Daleks, saw the return of the Daleks for the first time since Season 4's The Evil of the Daleks in 1967. This was also the first time that the Daleks had been seen in colour in the television series (they had been in colour in the two films starring Peter Cushing produced in the mid-1960s).

Broadcast
The entire season was broadcast from 1 January to 24 June 1972.

Home media

VHS releases

Betamax releases

Laserdisc releases

DVD and Blu-ray releases

In print

References

Bibliography 

 
 

1972 British television seasons
Season 09
Season 09
9